WVRR ("Walk FM") is a contemporary Christian formatted broadcast radio station licensed to Point Pleasant, West Virginia, United States, serving the Mid-Ohio Valley. WVRR is owned and operated by Baker Family Stations as a simulcast of WPJY 88.7 FM in the Parkersburg, West Virginia, area.

External links
 Walk FM Online
 
 
 

VRR
Point Pleasant, West Virginia